The 2015 WGC-Bridgestone Invitational was a professional golf tournament held August 6–9 on the South Course of Firestone Country Club in Akron, Ohio. It was the 17th WGC-Bridgestone Invitational tournament, and the third of the World Golf Championships events in 2015. Shane Lowry shot a final-round 66 to win his first WGC event, two strokes ahead of runner-up Bubba Watson.

Course layout

The South Course was designed by Bert Way and redesigned by Robert Trent Jones in 1960.

Field
The field consisted of players drawn primarily from the Official World Golf Ranking and the winners of the world-wide tournaments with the strongest fields.

1. Playing members of the 2014 United States and European Ryder Cup teams.

Thomas Bjørn, Keegan Bradley (2,3), Jamie Donaldson (2,3), Victor Dubuisson (2,3), Rickie Fowler (2,3,4), Jim Furyk (2,3,4), Stephen Gallacher, Sergio García (2,3), Zach Johnson (2,3,4), Martin Kaymer (2,3), Matt Kuchar (2,3), Hunter Mahan (2,3,4), Graeme McDowell, Phil Mickelson (2,3), Ian Poulter (2,3), Patrick Reed (2,3,4), Justin Rose (2,3,4), Webb Simpson (2,3), Jordan Spieth (2,3,4), Henrik Stenson (2,3,4), Jimmy Walker (2,3,4), Bubba Watson (2,3,4), Lee Westwood (2,3,4,5)
Rory McIlroy (2,3,4) withdrew due to an ankle injury.

2. The top 50 players from the Official World Golf Ranking as of July 27, 2015.

Paul Casey (3,4), Jason Day (3,4), Branden Grace (3,4,5), Bill Haas (3,4), Russell Henley, Charley Hoffman (3), J. B. Holmes (3,4), Billy Horschel (3,4), Thongchai Jaidee (3), Dustin Johnson (3,4), Kevin Kisner (3), Brooks Koepka (3,4), Anirban Lahiri (4), Marc Leishman (3), Shane Lowry (3), Hideki Matsuyama (3), Francesco Molinari (3), Ryan Moore (3,4), Kevin Na (3), Louis Oosthuizen (3), Ryan Palmer (3), Charl Schwartzel (3), Adam Scott (3), Brandt Snedeker (3,4), Brendon Todd (3), Bernd Wiesberger (3,4), Danny Willett (3,4), Gary Woodland (3)
Chris Kirk (3,4) withdrew due to a hand injury.

3. The top 50 players from the Official World Golf Ranking as of August 3, 2015.

Marc Warren, Robert Streb (4)

4. Tournament winners, whose victories are considered official, of tournaments from the Federation Tours since the prior season's Bridgestone Invitational with an Official World Golf Ranking Strength of Field Rating of 115 points or more.

An Byeong-hun, Bae Sang-moon, Steven Bowditch, Andrew Dodt, Matt Every, Fabián Gómez, James Hahn, Pádraig Harrington, Mikko Ilonen, Søren Kjeldsen, Pablo Larrazábal, Danny Lee, David Lingmerth, David Lipsky, Joost Luiten, Ben Martin, Troy Merritt, Marcel Siem, Gary Stal, Camilo Villegas, Oliver Wilson
Alex Norén withdrew due to a rib injury.

5. The winner of selected tournaments from each of the following tours:
Asian Tour: Thailand Golf Championship (2014) – Lee Westwood, already qualified under categories 1, 2, 3, and 4
PGA Tour of Australasia: BetEasy Masters (2014) – Nick Cullen
Japan Golf Tour: Bridgestone Open (2014) – Koumei Oda
Japan Golf Tour: Japan Golf Tour Championship – Liang Wenchong
Sunshine Tour: Dimension Data Pro-Am – Branden Grace, already qualified under categories 2, 3, and 4

Notably missing from the field is former number 1 player Tiger Woods, who is outside the top 200 in the world rankings and whose last tournament win was his eighth title at the 2013 WGC-Bridgestone Invitational.

Nationalities in the field

Past champions in the field 

Source:

Round summaries

First round
Thursday, August 6, 2015

Danny Lee shot a 5-under-par 65 to take the lead by one stroke over Jim Furyk and Graeme McDowell. The greens were firm and difficult and only 21 golfers in the field of 77 managed under-par rounds.

Second round
Friday, August 7, 2015

Source:

Third round
Saturday, August 8, 2015

Source:

Final round
Sunday, August 9, 2015

Shane Lowry's 66 (−4) overtook third round co-leaders Justin Rose and Jim Furyk, who each carded 72 (+2). Runner-up Bubba Watson also shot 66 and finished two strokes behind Lowry.

Source:

Scorecard
Final round

Cumulative tournament scores, relative to par

Source

References

External links

Coverage on European Tour's official site
Firestone Country Club site

WGC Invitational
WGC-Bridgestone Invitational
WGC-Bridgestone Invitational
WGC-Bridgestone Invitational
WGC-Bridgestone Invitational